The Men's 73 kg competition in judo at the 2012 Summer Olympics in London, United Kingdom, took place at ExCeL London.

The gold and silver medals were determined by a single-elimination tournament, with the winner of the final taking gold and the loser receiving silver.  Judo events awarded two bronze medals.  Quarterfinal losers competed in a repechage match for the right to face a semifinal loser for a bronze medal (that is, the judokas defeated in quarterfinals A and B competed against each other, with the winner of that match facing the semifinal loser from the other half of the bracket).

Schedule
All times are British Summer Time (UTC+1)

Results

Finals

Repechages

Pool A

Pool B

Pool C

Pool D

Controversy
American Nicholas Delpopolo was ejected from the Games and disqualified by the International Olympic Committee from his seventh position finish after he tested positive for marijuana. Though he claimed he had accidentally taken the banned substance before the Games begun, he apologized for the "embarrassment."

References

Bracket

Men's 073 kg
Judo at the Summer Olympics Men's Lightweight
Men's events at the 2012 Summer Olympics